General Emilio Aguinaldo, officially the Municipality of General Emilio Aguinaldo,  is a 5th class municipality in the province of Cavite, Philippines. According to the 2020 census, it has a population of 23,973 people.

Etymology
The town is also known by its former official name of Bailen. The municipality's current official name was adopted in 1965 and is named after Emilio Aguinaldo, the president of the First Philippine Republic, who died the year before the rename. In 2012, municipality administrators voted to revert the town's name back to Bailen; however, this has yet to be ratified.

History
The municipality of General Emilio Aguinaldo used to be a separate Catholic parish in the town of adjacent Maragondon. It was founded by virtue of a decree issued on August 28, 1857, by Archbishop Fray Aranguren, OSA, of the Archdiocese of Manila. The decree separated the barrios of Batas and Guyong-guyong from the town of Maragondon, naming the new parish Bailen after a town in the province of Jaén. It is recounted that a group of citizens from Barrio Batas petitioned Spanish Governor-General Fernando Norzagaray to convert their barrio into a municipality because of its distance from the town proper. Giving due course to the petition, the Spanish governor approved the request on August 2, 1858.

Bailen, the town's original name, is said to be coined from the Spanish word "bailar", meaning "to dance". Another claim is that it was named after a Spanish town of the same name, and it is much more plausible. The American civil government, from 1899 to 1901, reduced the number of towns to facilitate the military policy of concentrating the civilian population of the poblaciones. The Philippine Commission approved Act No. 947 on October 15, 1903, annexing the municipalities of Bailen and Mendez to Alfonso, thus becoming barrios of Alfonso. The Philippine Commission, for the second time in 1904, reorganized the entire province of Cavite reducing its 22 municipalities to 9 groups of towns. Bailen was annexed to Mendez. Bailen was reconverted into an independent municipality in 1915, with the complete restoration of peace and order in Cavite.

On June 19, 1965, with the signing of Republic Act No. 4346, the town's name, Bailen, was changed to General Emilio Aguinaldo, in honor of the first Philippine president who died the year before.

On September 3, 2012, administrators voted to revert the town's name back to Bailen. The Sangguniang Panglalawigan (Provincial Board) unanimously approved Committee Report 118-2012 renaming General Emilio Aguinaldo during the 95th Regular Session. This change, however, has yet to be ratified.

Geography
It is bordered to the north and east by the town of Maragondon, by Alfonso to the south, and Magallanes to the west.

Barangays
Bailen is politically subdivided into 14 barangays (4 urban, 10 rural).

Climate

Demographics

Economy

Government

The following are the elected officials of the town elected last May 09, 2022 which serves until 2025:

See also
List of renamed cities and municipalities in the Philippines

References

External links

Profile: General Emilio Aguinaldo - Official Website of the Province of Cavite
Profile: General Emilio Aguinaldo, Cavite - DILG Calabarzon Region
[ Philippine Standard Geographic Code]

Municipalities of Cavite